The imperial election of 1653 was an imperial election held to select the emperor of the Holy Roman Empire.  It took place in Augsburg on May 31.

Background 
This was the first imperial election to take place after the Thirty Years' War.

On October 31, 1517, Martin Luther, a professor of moral theology at the University of Wittenberg, now part of the Martin Luther University of Halle-Wittenberg, had delivered the Ninety-five Theses to Albert of Brandenburg, the elector of Mainz.  This list of propositions criticized the practice of selling indulgences, remissions of the punishment meted out for sin in Purgatory.  Luther's criticism snowballed into a massive schism in the church, and from there into a split among the states of the empire.

On August 26 and 27, 1619, the Protestant estates of Kingdom of Bohemia deposed the Catholic king Ferdinand II, Holy Roman Emperor and invited the Lutheran elector of the Electoral Palatinate, Frederick V of the Palatinate, to take his place.  This Bohemian Revolt was put down with the help of the Catholic League, a confederation of Catholic princes of the empire.  The league's leader, Maximilian I, Elector of Bavaria, was granted the Upper Palatinate and its electoral rights in a treaty of 1619, confirmed at the Diet of Regensburg on February 25, 1623.

The revolt ignited a broader religious war across Germany, the Thirty Years' War, which would involve not only the states of the empire but also Sweden, the Dutch Republic, France, Denmark–Norway, England, Scotland, Spain and Hungary and which would kill some eight million people before its end.  The Peace of Westphalia which ended the war in 1648 revived the principle of cuius regio, eius religio established in 1555 by the Peace of Augsburg and established the modern concept of Westphalian sovereignty.  It additionally reinstated the electoral rights of the Electoral Palatinate, though not its territorial rights in the Upper Palatinate.  Bavaria was raised to the Electorate of Bavaria, bringing the number of electors of the empire to eight.

Ferdinand III, Holy Roman Emperor called for the election of his successor.  To avoid a tie, his son, Ferdinand IV, King of the Romans, king of Bohemia and the presumptive favorite, agreed to abstain.  The remaining seven electors were:

 Johann Philipp von Schönborn, elector of Mainz
 Karl Kaspar von der Leyen, elector of Trier
 Maximilian Henry of Bavaria, elector of Cologne
 Ferdinand Maria, Elector of Bavaria, elector of Bavaria
 John George I, Elector of Saxony, elector of Saxony
 Frederick William, Elector of Brandenburg, elector of Brandenburg
 Charles I Louis, Elector Palatine, elector of the Electoral Palatinate

Elected 
Ferdinand IV was elected.

Aftermath  
Ferdinand IV predeceased his father, dying of smallpox on July 9, 1654.

1653
1653 in the Holy Roman Empire
Non-partisan elections
17th-century elections in Europe
Ferdinand III, Holy Roman Emperor